Niall Ó Muineacháin (born 10 July 1989) is an Irish hurler who plays as a left corner-back for the Kildare senior team.

Born in Celbridge, County Kildare, Mackey first arrived on the inter-county scene when he first linked up with the Kildare minor team, before later lining out with the under-21 side. He made his senior debut in the 2008 Christy Ring Cup. Ó Muineacháin has gone on to play a key role for Kildare since then, and has won one Christy Ring Cup medal and one National League (Division 3A) medal.

At club level Ó Muineacháin is a four-time championship medallist with Celbridge.

He scored an own goal against London in the opening minute of the 2022 Christy Ring Cup contest.

Honours

Team

Celbridge
Kildare Senior Hurling Championship (4): 2009, 2010, 2011, 2013

Kildare
Christy Ring Cup (1): 2014 (c)
National League (Division 3A) (1): 2009
Kehoe Cup (1): 2013

References

1989 births
Living people
Kildare inter-county hurlers
Celbridge hurlers